Henry Egerton Cotton  (21 July 1929 – 1993), (also known as Henry E. Cotton) served as Lord Lieutenant of Merseyside from 1989 to 1993. He was also the First Chancellor of Liverpool John Moores University, serving in office from 1992 until his death in 1993.

Personal life
Henry Cotton was the son of Colonel Vere Egerton Cotton and his wife Elfreda (née Moore). On 18 June 1955, he married Elizabeth Peard, daughter of Clifford James Peard, DSO, JP. They had one daughter, Catherine and one son, Timothy. Catherine (Kate) Cotton had one daughter, Natalie Psillou.

Education
He was educated at Rugby School, Rugby, Warwickshire, and later graduated from Magdalene College, Cambridge, in 1952 with a B.A. degree. Henry Cotton was also in the Royal Artillery (Territorial Army) where he gained the rank of Lieutenant.

University Chancellery
In 1992, Henry Cotton was appointed the First Chancellor of Liverpool John Moores University after it gained university status from being a polytechnic. The institution however goes as far back as 1823 to its foundation as the Liverpool Mechanics' School of Arts, entitling it to make a claim in the third-oldest university in England debate. He served in office until his death in 1993. He was succeeded by John Moores, Jr, CBE who was the son of Sir John Moores after whom the university is named.

A statue of Henry Cotton inscribed "Henry Egerton Cotton Esq, (1929-1993) LL.D, JP, First Chancellor of the University, 1992-1993" has been erected outside the Henry Cotton Building named in his honour, on the university's City Campus in Liverpool.

External links
Portrait of Henry Cotton as Chancellor

References

Alumni of Magdalene College, Cambridge
People associated with Liverpool John Moores University
People educated at Rugby School
Royal Artillery officers
Lord-Lieutenants of Merseyside
1929 births
1993 deaths